Beast Man is a supervillain in the toy line and cartoon series Masters of the Universe; the savage right-hand man of Skeletor, he can control many wild creatures and has brute strength.

Character history

The 1980s
The original design sketch of Beast Man by Mattel toy designer Mark Taylor was rejected by Mattel for looking too much like Chewbacca.

Figure
Beast Man was one of the first eight characters to be created for the Masters of the Universe toy line by Mattel in the early 1980s, and one of the first four to be completed and released (the other three being He-Man, Man-At-Arms and Skeletor). When the character was developed by Mattel, the name of Beast Man was reused from a figure in Mattel's earlier Flash Gordon toy line.

In an early story for the toy line (then called 'The Fighting Foe Men') written by the first mini-comics author Don Glut, Beast Man was at one stage planned to be the line's main villain, but this role ended up being given back to Skeletor (prototype name De-Man), with Beast Man as his main henchman. The character was also known as 'Tree Man' in the original conceptual drawings by Mark Taylor.

The figure came with red removable chest and arm armor, and was armed with a string whip, which was recycled from Mattel's earlier Big Jim toy line. Being one of the early figures to be continually re-issued with each successive wave, late examples of the figure can be found with a hard, solid head as opposed to the more common hollow, 'squeezable' rubber one. The 'solid head' version is far rarer.

The Weapons Pak, which consisted of existing weapons and armor, mostly in different colours to their original, included yellow versions of Beast Man's torso and arm armor (as well as his whip, in its original black). As a result, many examples of the Beast Man figure found on the second-hand market can be found to be wearing this yellow version of the armor. Some sellers even promote this as a variant version of the figure, but in actuality it is just down to previous owners mixing the parts up over the years, as Beast Man figures only ever came wearing the red version of the armor.

Later in the original toy-line's run, Beast Man also has the unfortunate distinction of being the character most often depicted being trapped and covered with evil green slime in the Evil Horde's Slime Pit ending up as a slime-monster who willingly obeyed Hordak's commands.

Filmation cartoon series
Beast Man appears frequently in the toy line's accompanying cartoon series by Filmation, introduced in the first episode "Diamond Ray of Disappearance". Although toned down slightly for the younger-child friendly series, as were many of the characters, his cartoon portrayal is generally consistent with his mini-comic portrayal, although in some early episodes the show's writers added extra dimensions to his character in that despite his loyalty, he clearly resents being bossed around by Skeletor and secretly desires to someday overthrow his master. This side of his character is brought to the forefront in the episode "Prince Adam No More", in which he is finally thrown out of Skeletor's crew. Feeling useless without the power of Snake Mountain behind him, he sets out to prove his worth by capturing King Randor by himself and imprisoning him within Snake Mountain. Although he succeeded in capturing the King, when He-Man comes to the rescue he is subjected once again to Skeletor's wrath and admitted back into his ranks purely so Skeletor has someone to vent his anger on. But his final line in the episode "It's kind of nice to be home" indicates he now feels he belongs as Skeletor's underling, and subsequent episodes portray him mostly for comedy value, willingly succumbing to Skeletor's abuse and constantly bungling his schemes. Notable episodes for Beast Man in the show's later stages include "The Shadow of Skeletor" and "Orko's Return" which restore him to his original, darker portrayal, working independently and craftily to achieve his aims. The powers of Beast-Man are shown effective in some earlier episodes, such as "Creatures From The Tar Swamp", "A Beastly Sideshow" and "The Dragon Invasion". His ability to control animals is not impeccable, however. For instance, he cannot control Cringer, Battle Cat, a dragon defending her young, or Panthor (although does trick Cringer into a trap in "A Beastly Sideshow").

Beast Man remained a fairly regular character throughout the run of the 1980s series, while some other earlier figures like Zodac, Mer-Man, Tri-Klops and Stratos gradually dropped out of sight when newer characters were released. He generally held his position as Skeletor's right-hand man throughout the cartoon's run, although in some later second-season episodes this position was occasionally filled by characters such as Clawful or Whiplash, as writers attempted to promote newer characters more prominently. Beast Man was often teamed up with Trap Jaw, one of the other earlier characters to remain consistent through the show's life.

Beast Man's background is never mentioned in the cartoon, although the series bible states a surprising origin for him, explaining he was once a thuggish human from Earth called Biff Beastman who owned a farmyard on which he constantly abused the animals. He was recruited as chief technician on the spacecraft piloted by Marlena Glenn, which crashlanded on Eternia, but he wound up on Skeletor's homeworld of Infinita, where he was mutated into Beast Man and recruited by Skeletor. This origin story appears in a storybook entitled "New Champions of Eternia" but was unpopular with most of the show's writers and therefore excluded from the series.

Other media 
Beast Man is included in numerous MOTU storybooks throughout the 1980s. One such range of storybooks is the UK Ladybird Books which reveals he was the leader of a tribe of Beast People from the Vine Jungle. Although this background has never been mentioned in any of the more prominent MOTU incarnations (except for the DC Comics, which features the "Beastmen"), it is generally a popular concept amongst fans that he hails from a jungle tribe.

The 1987 live-action movie 
Beast Man also appears in the live action Masters of the Universe movie in 1987. Although credited as 'Beastman' (all one word), he is presented as "the Beastman" within the movie. Played by Tony Carroll, he is portrayed somewhat differently from other incarnations, appearing as a savage minion of Skeletor's, who merely growls instead of speaking. Although his lack of speech might indicate a lower level of intelligence than his usual depiction, the character is shown as capable of using high-tech weapons, working in a team and following orders. (He is also seen to carry a rather battered, simple sword at his waist, although is not seen actually using it in the movie.) When Skeletor incinerates Saurod for the broader team's failure, Beast Man clutches at his master's hand and makes a great show of begging for his life.

Redesigned by European comic artist Moebius, Beast Man has the same concepts as his familiar version, yet at the same time has a noticeably different appearance, with longer, browner fur rather than his usual orange, no blue face markings and a possibly Samurai-influenced new design for his chest armor.

Although drawn to resemble his film counterpart, Beast Man of the movie's comic book adaptation has more in common with the cartoon and toy versions. He talks and even replaces Blade as Evil-Lyn's helper during the scene of her interrogating Kevin Corrigan.

One of the original drafts from the script by David Odell (whose previous writing credits include Supergirl and The Dark Crystal) was reviewed in the third episode of the He-Man and She-Ra podcast, Masters Cast. The original draft included more time spent on Eternia and Snake Mountain, had Beast man in a speaking role, and even revealed that He-Man's mother was originally from Earth, as per the character Queen Marlena from the Filmation animated series He-Man and the Masters of the Universe, thus linking the two planets.

2002 revamp and Mike Young Productions animated series 
Beast Man returns in the 2002 relaunch of the MOTU toy line and series. Possessing essentially the same design as the classic version of the character, the 2002 Beast Man is depicted as being a physically much larger creature with a hunched back. He is one of the largest revamped villains, rivaled in size only by Whiplash and Clawful. The figure's colour scheme is darkened down slightly, with deeper orange-red fur instead of the vintage figure's bright orange, and dark brown armor in place of the original's red. The figure's arm armor is now molded on (whereas the original's was removable), and now also sports similar armor on his lower legs. The action feature of this new version of the figure is his arms, which swing downwards when a button on his back is pressed. When the Four Horsemen originally designed the new version, they had planned for the figure to have a vocal 'roaring' feature, but this was eventually dropped due to production budget restraints.

His portrayal in the new cartoon series is much the same as the old, although in this incarnation he never shows any signs of desire to overthrow Skeletor, remaining permanently loyal to his "pal". Beast Man is the only character shown to fully trust Skeletor as a friend, and this trust (if not the respect) is returned in "The Mystery of Anwat Gar" when his master grants him a superweapon. Although he still can control over all wild animals, he has difficulty controlling dragons as is showcased in the episode "Dragon's Brood". Beast Man still carries a whip, but relations with his animals are characterized by mutual affection.

Although his background is not mentioned in the show, the accompanying MVCreations comic series published an origin story for him (as Icons of Evil #1, written by Robert Kirkman and drawn by Tony Moore) in which he is revealed to originate from the Berserker Islands, where he first encounters Keldor before his transformation into Skeletor. He has remained subservient to Skeletor ever since he saved his life for the sake of recruiting him as his servant.

Masters of the Universe Classics 
The MOTU Classics toyline that started in 2008 includes short character biographies on the backs of the packaging. These merge elements from various incarnations of the franchise with some newly developed information to form a new, distinct "Classics" continuity. Additionally, there are several mini-comics and posters which further add to this new canon.

He-Man and the Masters of the Universe (2012)

The 2012 DC comic borrows a concept created for MOTU Classics, that there is an entire species of creatures called Beast Men. Beast Man is a member of that species. Born Raqquill Rquazz, Beast Man was banished to the Vine Jungle by his kind for his evil deeds where he met up with Keldor during a skirmish in the Berserker Islands. His animal-controlling abilities prove to be useful in Skeletor's campaign to take over Eternia.

Live Action He-Man movie
Beast Man will appear in the live action He-Man movie. In the film, he's a savage and powerful foe and will bring a little something different to the table: he’s a shapeshifter with the ability to turn into any type of beast, making him a useful spy for Skeletor as well as a formidable fighter.

Reception
Comic Book Resources list the character as part of He-Man: 15 Most Powerful Masters of the Universe. Beast man was rated the 2nd most useless character.

Notes
 In the German audio-book series a character biography was given in the episode "Nacht über Castle Grayskull" (Night over Castle Grayskull). It is said that Beast Man was once an intelligent scientist. He found a powerful magic plate and changed it so that Skeletor could not use it any more. For that Skeletor tortured him and gave him a toxin to destroy his intelligence. This made Beast Man Skeletor's loyal, yet stupid, servant and slave.

References

Villains in animated television series
Fictional anthropomorphic characters
Fictional characters introduced in 1981
Fictional henchmen
Fictional humanoids
Fictional whip users
Masters of the Universe Evil Warriors
Male supervillains
Male characters in animated series